Marvin Carl Schumann (May 19, 1906 – June 15, 1994) was an American farmer, businessman, and politician.

Schumann was born in Graham Township, Benton County, Minnesota. He lived in Rice, Minnesota with his wife and family. Schumann went to the University of Minnesota School of Agriculture. He was a farmer and was involved in the insurance businessman. Schumann served with the Rice Fire Department. He served on the Rice School Board and on the Benton County Commission. Schumann served in the Minnesota House of Representatives from 1955 to 1962 and was a Republican. Schumann died at the County Manor Health Care and Retirement Center in Sartell, Minnesota.

References

1906 births
1994 deaths
People from Benton County, Minnesota
University of Minnesota alumni
Businesspeople from Minnesota
Farmers from Minnesota
County commissioners in Minnesota
School board members in Minnesota
Republican Party members of the Minnesota House of Representatives